Chargha is a deep fried chicken dish from Lahore, Punjab, Pakistan. The term chargha is a term of the Pashto (of the Pashtun people) language meaning "chicken". The dish is widely popular throughout Pakistan. 

The whole chicken is marinated overnight in the refrigerator with sauce made of spices mixed with yoghurt, with horizontal cuts through the chicken in order to infuse the flavors. The marinated chicken is first steamed until tender and then fried in oil to give a crisp texture.

See also
 List of chicken dishes
 Lahori cuisine
 Pakistani cuisine
 Pakistani meat dishes

References

External links
 In Lahore: A food lover's guide 

Pakistani chicken dishes
Indian chicken dishes
Lahori cuisine